Lambaré is a city in Central Department, Paraguay, part of the Gran Asunción metropolitan area. With a population of approximately 140,000 inhabitants, it is the sixth-most populous city in the country.

Toponymy

The name of the town derive from the Guarani language Ambaré, "the land of shadows". The people were known as avambaré, citizens of El Ambaré.

Notable residents
Rafael Lovera - professional boxer

References
World Gazeteer: Paraguay – World-Gazetteer.com																

 
Populated places established in 1766